Aleksandar Busnić (born 4 December 1997) is a Serbian football central midfielder who plays for Vojvodina.

References

External links
 
 
 

1997 births
Living people
Association football midfielders
Serbian footballers
FK Rad players
Serbian SuperLiga players
FK Bežanija players
Serbian First League players
OFK Žarkovo players
Serbia international footballers
FK Vojvodina players